is a dam in Tosa, Kōchi Prefecture, Japan, completed in 1982.

References 

Dams in Kōchi Prefecture
Dams completed in 1982
1982 establishments in Japan